Rimula is a genus of sea snails, marine gastropod mollusks in the family Fissurellidae, the keyhole limpets.

The name of the genus is a diminutive  of "rime", a fissure.

Description
The shell is thin and cancellated, with a perforation near the anterior margin.

Species
Species within the genus Rimula include:
Rimula aequisculpta Dall, 1927
Rimula astricta McLean, 1970
† Rimula blainvillii (Defrance, 1825) 
 † Rimula bonneti Cossmann, 1907 
Rimula californiana Berry, 1964
Rimula dorriae Pérez Farfante, 1947
 † Rimula dubia (Defrance, 1819) 
 Rimula escondida Poppe & Tagaro, 2020
Rimula frenulata (Dall, 1889)
 † Rimula gaasensis Lozouet, 1999 
 † Rimula laubrierei Cossmann, 1888 
Rimula leptarcis Simone & Cunha, 2014 
 † Rimula lobilloensis Landau & Mulder, 2020 
 Rimula mariei Crosse, 1866
Rimula mexicana Berry, 1969
Rimula pycnonema Pilsbry, 1943
 Rimula navis Poppe & Tagaro, 2020
 † Rimula plateaui Cossmann, 1896 
 Rimula pycnonema Pilsbry, 1943
Rimula rhips Herbert & Kilburn, 1986
Species brought into synonymy
Rimula asturiana Fischer, 1882: synonym of Cranopsis asturiana (P. Fischer, 1882)
Rimula carinifera Schepman, 1908: synonym of Cranopsis carinifera (Schepman, 1908)
Rimula cumingii Adams, 1853: synonym of Cranopsis cumingii (Adams, 1853)
Rimula exquisita Adams, 1853: synonym of Puncturella exquisita (A. Adams, 1853) (original combination)
Rimula galeata Gould, 1846: synonym of Puncturella galeata (Gould, 1846)
Rimula granulata Seguenza, 1862: synonym of Cranopsis granulata (Seguenza, 1862)
Rimula verrieri Crosse, 1871: synonym of Cranopsis verrieri (Crosse, 1871)
Species inquirenda
Rimula carinata Adams, 1853 
Rimula cognata Gould, 1852
Rimula echinata Gould, 1859 
Rimula propinqua Adams, 1853

References

External links
 Defrance [J.L.M.. (1827). Rimulaire ou Rimule (foss.) pp. 471-472; pl. 68 fig. 1a,b, in: Dictionnaire des Sciences Naturelles (F. Cuvier, ed.), vol. 45. Levrault, Strasbourg & Le Normant, Paris]
 Bronn, H. G. (1834-1838). Lethaea geognostica oder Abbildungen und Beschreibungen der für die Gebirgs-Formationen bezeichnendsten Versteinerungen. Vol. 1, pp. 1-544

Fissurellidae